Loïc Henri Marcel Matile (26 June 1938 – 10 June 2000, in Paris)  was a French entomologist who specialised in Diptera (Bolitophilidae, Diadocidiidae, Keroplatidae, Lygistorrhinidae, Mycetophilidae).

Matile worked at the Muséum national d'histoire naturelle where he held the Chair of Entomology for a brief period before his death.

Works
(Selected)
with W.A. Steffan & R.J. Gagné Families Mycetophilidae, Sciaridae and Cecidomyiidae. In Evenhuis, N.L. (ed.), Catalog of the Diptera of Australasia and Oceania. Bishop Museum Special Publication 86.(1989).
Recherches sur la Systematique et l'Evolution des Keroplatidae (Diptera, Mycetophiloide). Memoires Du Museum National D'Histoire Naturelle 148 (1990)
Diptères d'Europe Occidentale Tomes 1 and 2 Atlas d'Entomologie.Editions N. Boubée.Paris (2000).

References
Anonym 2000 [Matile, L.] Revue fr. Ent., (N. S.) 22(4) 129-133, Portr. 
Daugeron, C., Charbonnel, J. & Bourgoin, T. 2002 [Matile, L.]  Ann. Soc. Ent. Fr. (N. S.) 38(1/2) 5-11, Portrait. (Read on line) 
Cranston, P.,2000 .Loïc humour, passion and commitment Ann. Soc. Ent. Fr. (N. S.) 38(1/2) 4 (Read on line) 
Dupis, C. & J. P. 2001: [Matile, L.] Bull. Soc. Ent. Fr. 106(4) 325-327, Portr.

French entomologists
Dipterists
1938 births
2000 deaths
20th-century French zoologists
National Museum of Natural History (France) people